Anton Tennet (born 6 February 1987) is an actor from New Zealand. He is known for his roles in New Zealand/Australian TV shows and movies, and is the older brother of Olivia Tennet, an actress, and Emma Tennet, a dancer.

Filmography

Theatre

References

External links

1987 births
Living people
New Zealand male television actors
New Zealand male film actors
New Zealand male stage actors